Changnyeong Women's Football Club is a South Korean women's football team based in Bugok, Changnyeong County. The team joined the WK League, the top division of women's football in South Korea, in 2018. They play their home games at the Changnyeong Sports Park.

Players

Current squad

Season-by-season records

References

External links

Women's football clubs in South Korea
WK League clubs
Association football clubs established in 2018
Sport in South Gyeongsang Province
Football clubs in South Gyeongsang Province
2018 establishments in South Korea